Bedasht (also Romanized as Badasht) is a village in Howmeh Rural District, in the Central District of Shahrud County, Semnan Province, Iran. At the 2006 census, its population was 466, in 143 families.

A conference of Bábís was held there in 1848; see Conference of Badasht.

References 

Populated places in Shahrud County